Sarpuria is a sweet originating from West Bengal, India. Sarpuria is a famous sweet of Krishnanagar.

Origin
There are two leading stories that tell the origin of Sarapuriya. In one, Chaitanyadev used to eat three types of confectionery. As mentioned in Chaitanya charitamrita written by Krishnadas Kaviraj almost 520 years ago, one of them was Sarpuri or Sarapuriya. Advaita Acharya himself sent Sarapuriya to Chaitanyadev. 
Sarpuria is an integral part of making an offering to Chaitanya Mahaparabhu. According to the historical evidence, Krishnagar and the nearby area were chiefly occupied by a large family of milkmen. Thus, the sarpuria came as a West Bengal sweet.
 
The other story says the creator of Sarpuria was the Chandra Das of Krishnanagar.  Sarpuria's creator is the father of his father Surukumar Das. It is said that, behind closed doors, at night, he used to make doors with sana, latex and sarp, Sarapuriya and his other discovery Sarvaja. The next morning, he used to ferry in the head.  The younger Adhar Chandra learned how to cook sweets for his father. In 1902, the sweet shop was established at Nadiar Para, i.e. the present Ananta Hari Mitra Road.।  The name of the shop is Adhar Chandra Das. In time, it became an institution. But out of fear of haing his recipe stolen, he only made sweets at night, alone. But when the recipe was published gradually, other mules were made to make Sarapuriya and Sarwaja.

Geographical indication status
Sarpuria will get the GI registration as the origin of the sweet. The West Bengal Government sent the registration details for the GI tag on 25 May 2017.

References

Bengali cuisine
Sweets of West Bengal
Indian confectionery